Welde Hiwot (Amharic: ዋልዳ ሄወት) (fl. 17th century), also called Mitku, was an Ethiopian philosopher.

Biography
Walda Heywat was the student of Zera Yacob, whose work he continued in his Treatise of Walda Heywat, written in Ge'ez. Walda Heywat was the son of Habta Egziabher (called Habtu), a friend of Zera Yacob in the town of Emfraz, where Zera Yacob spent the second part of his life. Zera Yacob was the teacher of the sons of Habtu and introduced Walda Heywat to his philosophy.

It was Walda Heywat for whom Zera Yacob wrote his Treatise of Zera Yacob, describing both his life and his thoughts.

Further reading

 Enno Littmann. Philosophi Abessini. Corpus Scriptorum Christianorum Orientalium, Vol. 18, Scriptores Aethiopici, Presses Républicaines, 1904. Contains the Ge'ez text of Walda Heywat's treatise.
 Claude Sumner, Ethiopian Philosophy, vol. II: The Treatise of Zara Yaecob and Walda Hewat: Text and Authorship, Commercial Printing Press, 1976.
 Claude Sumner, Ethiopian Philosophy, vol. III: The Treatise of Zara Yaecob and Walda Hewat: An Analysis, Commercial Printing Press, 1978.
 Claude Sumner. Classical Ethiopian Philosophy, Commercial Printing Press, 1985. Contains an English translation of Walda Heywat's treatise and four other texts.
 Claude Sumner, "The Light and the Shadow: Zera Yacob and Walda Heywat: Two Ethiopian Philosophers of the Seventeenth Century," in Wiredu and Abraham, eds., A Companion to African Philosophy, 2004.

References

External links
 Ethiopian Philosophy - A blog devoted to Zera Yacob and Walda Heywat

17th-century Ethiopian people
17th-century philosophers
Ethiopian non-fiction writers
Ethiopian philosophers
1599 births
1692 deaths